Carl Stuart Ashmore (born 17 August 1968) is an English children's author. He is best known for his book The Time Hunters.

Early life and education
Ashmore was born in the town of Crewe, Cheshire in 1968. He is a graduate of Bournemouth University.

Work
Before working as an author he worked for Granada Television and a lecturer in film and media at Burslem College.

Ashmore wrote his first book The Time Hunters in 2006 while spending a years sabbatical on the south coast of France. His other books include The Time Hunters and the Box of Eternity and The Time Hunters and the Spear of Fate (Books 2 and 3 in The Time Hunters series), Bernard and the Bibble and The Night They Nicked Saint Nick.

From 2013 his best-known book The Time Hunters will be published in Brazil by Brazilian publishing house Bertrand Brasil.

References

External links
Official Website

People from Crewe
Alumni of Bournemouth University
British children's writers
21st-century English novelists
1968 births
Living people
English male novelists
21st-century English male writers